Amo or AMO may refer to:

Places
Amo, Indiana, United States, a town in Hendricks County
Amo Creek, a river in Alaska
Amu Darya, a river in Central Asia, sometimes referred to as "Amo"
Amo Township, Cottonwood County, Minnesota
Kampong Amo, a village in Brunei
Mao Airport (IATA code: AMO), serving the town of Mao, Chad
Mukim Amo, a mukim of Brunei

People
Amo (surname)
Adam Morrison or Amo (born 1984), American professional basketball player

Arts, entertainment, and media
Amo (TV series),  a 2017 Philippine crime drama series
AMO (band), a Slovak band
Amo (Bring Me the Horizon album), 2019
Amo (Miguel Bosé album), or the title track, 2014
"Amo", a 2022 song by Swedish rapper Dani M

Organizations
 AMO, the research arm of the Office for Metropolitan Architecture
Advanced Medical Optics, a corporation specializing in eye care products
American Maritime Officers, a labor union
Archery Trade Association or Archery Manufacturer and Merchant's Organization
Association of Municipalities of Ontario
Australian Music Online, an Australian music website
Avtomobilnoe Moskovskoe Obshchestvo or Zavod Imeni Likhocheva, a Soviet automobile factory

Computing and technology
addons.mozilla.org, also known as Mozilla Add-ons, the Mozilla Foundation's official online repository
Analysis services Management Object model, the administration and management object model in Microsoft Analysis Services
Atomic Memory Operation, a special kind of an Atomic Operation in programming

Healthcare and science
Ablation of osteosynthesis material, a medical procedure, also known in French as ablation du matériel d'ostéosynthèse
Ammonia monooxygenase, an enzyme
Atlantic multidecadal oscillation, a climate cycle expressed in the North Atlantic sea surface temperature
Atomic, molecular, and optical physics

Other uses
Amo language
Wharenui or amo, an architectural feature of a Māori meeting house
Karuka is called  in the Imbongu language

See also 

 
 AM0
 Amoo
 Ammo (disambiguation)